Pierre Nay (1898–1978) was a French film actor who appeared in 42 French films between 1928 and 1940.

Selected filmography
 Le Roi des resquilleurs (1930)
 Venetian Nights (1931)
 77 Rue Chalgrin  (1931)
 Under the Leather Helmet (1932)
 The Tunnel (1933)
 The Concierge's Daughters (1934)
 The Call of Silence (1936)
 Ultimatum (1938)
 Rail Pirates (1938)
 Mirages (1938)
 The Rules of the Game (1939)

References

Bibliography
 Jung, Uli & Schatzberg, Walter. Beyond Caligari: The Films of Robert Wiene. Berghahn Books, 1999.

External links

1898 births
1978 deaths
French male film actors
Male actors from Paris